Sky News Tonight is a weeknight news programme broadcast on Sky News from 7:00 pm. First aired on 1 September 2014, it is Sky's flagship newscast, featuring special reports, in-depth analysis and interviews.

History and Broadcasts  
From 21 April 2016, Sky News ended the show at 8 pm on Thursday to make room for the debate show The Pledge, which was axed in 2020, meaning Sky News Tonight regained this full slot.

From 26 September 2016, as part of a new schedule change, Dermot Murnaghan has presented Sky News Tonight from Monday to Thursday, with Sophy Ridge presenting on Fridays. Murnaghan left Sky News in February 2023.

The programme was formerly presented by Adam Boulton and Sarah Hewson. Various presenters have acted as relief when the main presenters are unavailable.

Current presenters

References

2014 British television series debuts
2020s British television series
English-language television shows
Sky News
Sky television news shows
Sky UK original programming